Shanghai Jiao Tong University (SJTU) is a public research university in Shanghai, China. The university is funded by the Ministry of Education of China. 

The university was established on April 8, 1896 as Nanyang Public School (南洋公學) by an imperial edict. The university is a member of the C9 League, Double First Class University Plan, Project 985, and Project 211. The university underwent a number of reformations and gained its current name in 1959. Shanghai Second Medical University was merged into the university on July 18, 2005.

Name
The word "Jiao Tong", or historically, "Chiao Tung", means transportation or communication. It reflects the university's root — it was founded by the Ministry of Posts and Communications of the late Qing dynasty. Jiao Tong or Chiao Tung could be translated as transport but it also means "extending in all directions". Engineering and managerial sciences are major academic focuses at the various Jiaotong universities, but not the only fields of research.

History

In 1896, the Nanyang Public School was founded in Shanghai by the imperial edict of the Guangxu Emperor, under the Business and Telegraphs Office of the Qing imperial government. Four schools were established: a normal school, a school of foreign studies, a middle school, and a high school. Sheng Xuanhuai, the mandarin who proposed the idea to the Guangxu Emperor, became the first president and is, along with missionary educator John Calvin Ferguson, regarded as the university's founder.

The Ministry of Commerce assumed administration of the college in 1904, and in 1905 changed the college's name to Imperial Polytechnic College of the Commerce Ministry. In 1906, the college was placed under the Ministry of Posts and Telegraphs. Its name was changed to Shanghai Industrial College of the Ministry of Posts and Telegraphs. When the Republic of China was founded, the college was placed under the Ministry of Communications and its name was once again changed, this time to Government Institute of Technology of the Communications Ministry.

In 1918, the Republic of China government founded the School of Management.  After a merger with two other colleges in 1920, the name changed to Nan Yang College of Chiao Tung.

The college achieved world renown in the 1930s and was referred to as the "Eastern MIT". In 1938, the Ministry of Education assumed administration of the university and renamed it to National Chiao Tung University, the name by which daughter institution National Chiao Tung University in Taiwan is known to this day. In 1943, the graduate school was founded.

When the Japanese surrendered in 1945, neither the Chinese Communist Party (CCP) nor the Kuomintang KMT trusted each other or were actively cooperating. After American-sponsored attempts to negotiate a coalition government failed in 1946, the Chinese Civil War resumed. The CCP defeated the Nationalists in 1949, forcing Chiang's government to retreat to Taiwan. During the evacuation, a part of the faculty and alumni was taken to Taiwan by Chiang Kai-shek, founding National Chiao Tung University in Taiwan in 1958.

After the Chinese Civil War, the People's Republic of China was founded in 1949. Chiao Tung lost its "National" appellation and became Chiao Tung University to reflect that all universities under the new socialist state would be public, and was renamed Jiao Tong University.

Shanghai Second Medical University was merged into Shanghai Jiao Tong University on July 18, 2005, under the name Shanghai Jiao Tong University School of Medicine.

Since the reform and opening-up policy in China, SJTU has grown substantially. It comprises five campuses, including Xuhui, Minhang, Luwan, Qibao, and Fahua (法华), taking up an area of about 3,225,833 square meters.

In 2006, it established the University of Michigan - Shanghai Jiao Tong University Joint Institute (UM-SJTU JI) with the University of Michigan.

In 2013, François Hollande inaugurated the SJTU-ParisTech Elite Institute of Technology (SPEIT), an institution based on the French engineering education system. The four founding member universities are École Polytechnique, ENSTA ParisTech, Mines ParisTech and Télécom ParisTech.

Academics, enrollment, and staff

Today SJTU has 31 schools (departments), 63 undergraduate programs, 250 masters-degree programs, 203 Ph.D. programs, 28 post-doctorate programs, and 11 state key laboratories and national engineering research centers.

Its total enrollment of students amounts to 40,711, of which 2,722 are international students. There are 16,221 undergraduates and 21,768 masters and Ph.D. candidates.

The university has more than 1,900 professors and associate professors, including 22 academicians of the Chinese Academy of Sciences, 24 academicians of the Chinese Academy of Engineering, 139 accredited professors, and chair professors of the "Chang Jiang Scholars Program".

Academic Ranking of World Universities 

In 2003, Shanghai Jiao Tong University produced the Academic Ranking of World Universities, making it the first global university ranking with multifarious indicators, which analyzes the top universities in the world on quality of faculty (40%), research output (40%), quality of education (10%) and performance vs. size (10%). Since 2009, ARWU has been published and copyrighted annually by Shanghai Ranking Consultancy, an independent organization that is not legally subordinated to any universities or government agencies.

Reputation and rankings

General Rankings 
Shanghai Jiao Tong University is consistently ranked among the top universities in the Asia-Pacific according to major international university rankings. Shanghai Jiao Tong University graduates are highly desired worldwide, with its Graduate Employability rankings 2017 placed at 33rd in the world in the QS Graduate Employability Rankings. The institution came 7th in the QS BRICS University Rankings 2019, and 5th in the Emerging Economies University Rankings 2021 by Times Higher Education.

As of 2022, the QS World University Rankings ranked SJTU 46th in the world. The Academic Ranking of World Universities, also known as the "Shanghai Ranking", placed SJTU 54th in the world, 6th in Asia and 4th in China after (Tsinghua, Peking and Zhejiang). The Times Higer Education World University Rankings ranked SJTU 52nd in the world, with its industry income and research performance indicator placed at =1st and 26th respectively in the world. 

Shanghai Jiao Tong University was ranked 28th among the most reputable universities in the world by the Times Higher Education World Reputation Rankings.

Research Performance and Subjects Rankings 
As of 2021, Shanghai Jiao Tong University was ranked 14th among universities around the world by SCImago Institutions Rankings. Regarding scientific research output, the Nature Index 2022 ranks SJTU the 8th university in China, the 9th university in the Asia Pacific region, and 22nd in the world among the global universities.

As of 2021, Shanghai Jiao Tong University ranks 11th globally and 2nd in the Asia & Oceania region by the University Ranking by Academic Performance. SJTU is ranked 2nd in the Asia & Oceania region and 17th globally by the Performance Ranking of Scientific Papers for World Universities with specific fields and subjects, ranked in the top 25 globally, including "Chemistry", "Mathematics", "Physics", "Chemical Engineering", "Civil Engineering", "Computer Science", "Electrical Engineering", "Material Science", "Molecular Biology & Genetics" "Mechanical Engineering", "Pharmacology & Toxicolog", "Energy Science & Engineering", "Environmental Science & Engineering" and "Biomedical Engineering".

In the 2021 ARWU Global Ranking of Academic Subjects, the SJTU had 11 disciplines in the world's top 20, 21 disciplines in the world's top 50 and 29 disciplines in the world's top 100.

Organization

Academic schools

Continuing Education
College of Smart Energy
Biomedical Engineering
Naval Architecture, Ocean and Civil Engineering
Mechanical Engineering
University of Michigan - Shanghai Jiao Tong University Joint Institute
SJTU – ParisTech Elite Institute of Technology (SPEIT)
China-UK Low Carbon College
Electronic, Information and Electrical Engineering
Materials Science and Engineering
Sciences: Mathematics and Physics
Life Science and biotechnology
Shanghai Center for Systems Biomedicine
Humanities
Chemistry and Chemical Engineering
Antai College of Economics and Management
Finance and MBA
International and Public Affairs
Foreign Languages
Agriculture and Biology
Environmental Science and Engineering
Pharmaceutics
Medical
Law
Design
Micro-electronics
Information Security Engineering
Software Engineering

Directly affiliated departments
Department of Plastic Technology
Department of Sports

Graduate school
Global Executive MBA Program (in collaboration with the University of Southern California)

Affiliated institutes
 Institute of Aerospace Science and Technology
 Research Institute of Micro/Nano Science and Technology
 Institute of Energy

Affiliated hospitals

 CWI International Peace Maternity and Child Health Hospital
 Ruijin Hospital 
 Renji Hospital 
 Xinhua Hospital 
 Shanghai General Hospital (zh) (also translated as Shanghai First People's Hospital)
 Shanghai Sixth People's Hospital 
 Shanghai Ninth People's Hospital
 Shanghai Third People's Hospital (Baosteel Hospital)
 Shanghai Children's Medical Center 
 Shanghai Chest Hospital
 Shanghai Mental Health Center
 Shanghai Children's Hospital

Student organizations

SJTU Dancing Team
Diversified genres including Latin, Ballet, Chinese Folk Dance, Chinese Classical Dance and Yang Go.
 Awards: Second-class prize on National University Art Competition

Campuses

Xuhui Campus

The previous main campus was located in Xujiahui, in the Xuhui District of Shanghai, formerly a mostly Catholic area and a site of several educational institutions.

The main gate, built in 1935, is of traditional Chinese style reflecting the university's earlier status as the "Imperial Polytechnic College". he main gate approaches were via a series of marble bridges, similar to, although smaller than, those built in front of Tiananmen. However, recent road expansions have demolished the river as well as most  bridges. A copy of this famous gate scene has been built on the east of the Minhang campus.

The construction of the campus never came to an end in the past century. Existing buildings: the Middle College building (built in 1898), the original library (built in 1919), the gymnasium (built in 1925), the administrative building (built in 1933), the Xinjian building (built in 1953), the new Upper College building (built in 1955), the second teaching building (built in 1960), Bao Zhaolong library (built in 1985) and Haoran high-tech building (built in 1996) were constructed one after another.

The university's School of International Education is located here, where many international students take classes throughout the academic year (however, most international students who take degree courses are in Minhang campus). The campus still houses various scientific research institutions, State Key Laboratory of Ocean Engineering, for instance, although most moved to the new campus since 1987.

Minhang Campus

The Minhang campus is located in the Minhang District on the outskirts of metropolitan Shanghai. This young campus, which was founded in 1987, covers 2,822,903m2 once farmland. Zizhu Science Park, where Intel, ST Microelectronics, Microsoft, Sandisk, and other high-tech companies placed their research and development centers, south of this campus.

Currently, most of the university's administrative and academic framework and the majority of undergraduate and graduate students are situated at this campus, and the campus has three libraries and seven dining halls.

South Chongqing Road Campus
It used to be the campus of Shanghai Second Medical University, which is located in the Luwan District of Shanghai. The Aurora University (Shanghai), a pre-eminent Catholic university in Shanghai, was located there before 1952.

Qibao Campus
In 1999, Shanghai Agricultural College was merged into SJTU. Its campus, located at 2678 Qixin Road, became the Qibao Campus of SJTU.

Shangzhong Road Campus
In 2006, Shanghai Jiao Tong University sold this campus to Shanghai High School.

Fahuazhen Road Campus
This campus is where Jiao Tong's Antai College of Economics and Management and the School of Continuing Education are located.

Lingang Campus
This campus is located at No 3 Yinlian Rd in the Lingang area. Jiao Tong's China-UK Low Carbon College moved to this campus in Step. 2018.

Notable alumni 

Today, associations organized by Jiao Tong's alumni can be found in the United States, Japan, European Union countries, Canada, Southeast Asia, Taiwan, Hong Kong and Mainland China. They call themselves Jiao Tong (Jiaoda) people.

The routine services of these alumni associations include: updating contact lists, holding conferences, conducting Sino-foreign cultural exchanges, and keeping contact with other alumni associations throughout the world.

Famous alumni of SJTU or its predecessors include Jiang Zemin, Wang Daohan, Ding Guangen, Huang Yanpei, Cai Er, Chen Zhu, Qian Xuesen, Mao Yushi, Wu Wenjun, Yan Junqi, Shen Xiaoming, Yang Yuanqing and many more. More than 200 of the academicians of the Chinese Academy of Sciences and Chinese Academy of Engineering are alumni of Jiao Tong University.

See also
 National Chiao Tung University
 Beijing Jiaotong University
 Xi'an Jiaotong University
 Southwest Jiaotong University

References

External links 

  

 
Project 211
Project 985
Plan 111
Educational institutions established in 1896
Jiaotong University
1896 establishments in China
C9 League
Vice-ministerial universities in China
Xuhui District
Universities and colleges in Shanghai